The 1983 NCAA Division I softball tournament were held in May at the end of the 1983 NCAA Division I softball season. Sixteen Division I college softball teams competed in the NCAA tournament's first round, which consisted of eight regionals with two teams each. The winner of each region, a total of eight teams, advanced to the 1983 Women's College World Series in Omaha, Nebraska. The 1983 Women's College World Series was the second NCAA-sponsored championship in the sport of college softball at the Division I level.  The event was held in Omaha, Nebraska from May 25 through May 29 and marked the conclusion of the 1983 NCAA Division I softball season. Texas A&M, following up its 1982 AIAW WCWS title, won the championship by defeating  2–1 in the final game.

Regionals

Cal State Fullerton qualifies for WCWS, 2–1

Indiana qualifies for WCWS, 2–1

South Carolina qualifies for WCWS, 2–1

Texas A&M qualifies for WCWS, 2–0

Missouri qualifies for WCWS, 2–1

UCLA qualifies for WCWS, 2–0

Pacific qualifies for WCWS, 2–1

Louisiana Tech qualifies for WCWS, 2–0

Women's College World Series

Participants

Texas A&M

Game results

Bracket

Game log

Championship Game

All-Tournament Team
The following players were named to the All-Tournament Team

See also
NCAA Division I Softball Championship
Women's College World Series
NCAA Division II Softball Championship
NCAA Division III Softball Championship
College World Series

References

1983 NCAA Division I softball season
NCAA Division I softball tournament